Terminal 3 of Jiangbei Airport is a metro station of Line 10 of Chongqing Rail Transit in Yubei District of Chongqing Municipality, China.

It serves the airport terminal in which the station's name derived from (Terminal 3A of Chongqing Jiangbei International Airport) and its surrounding area, including office buildings for Chongqing Airport Group and other facilities used by both airlines and the airport.

The station opened 4 months after the inauguration of Terminal 3A of the airport, before this public transportation to the terminal was served solely by airport buses and long-distance coaches. Free terminal shuttle buses were also arranged by the airport for passengers transferring between Terminals 2A & 2B and Terminal 3A partially to compensate the lack of the 2 Line 10 stations linking the terminals. The shuttle buses remain in service to this day as an alternative to the metro line.

Station Structure

Line 10 Platforms
Platform Layout

A total of 2 island platforms is used for Line 10 trains travelling in both directions.

Normal Line 10 services (stopping at all stations along the line) run through the 2 outer tracks whereas the 2 inner tracks are reserved for future Line 10 services with alternate route plans.

Exits
There are a total of 6 entrances/exits for the station.

Surroundings
GTC

Chongqing Jiangbei International Airport
Situated inside the Ground Traffic Center (GTC) of Terminal 3, the station is transferable with other modes of ground transportation at the terminal, including terminal shuttle buses, airport buses, long-distance coaches, taxis, car pooling services and private cars. Intercity railway services operated by CRH will also be available when its construction is complete.

Nearby Stations
Terminal 2 of Jiangbei Airport Station (a Line 3 & Line 10 Station)

See also
Chongqing Jiangbei International Airport
Chongqing Rail Transit (CRT)
Line 10 (CRT)

References

Railway stations in Chongqing
Railway stations in China opened in 2017
Airport railway stations in China
Chongqing Rail Transit stations